Binger  is a town in Caddo County, Oklahoma, United States. The population was 672 at the 2010 census. It is the headquarters of the Caddo Nation of Oklahoma, who were settled in the area during the 1870s.

History
Binger was established immediately after the opening of the Wichita-Caddo Reservation in August 1901, and organized by the Washita Valley Townsite Company. It was named for Binger Hermann, then Commissioner of the U. S. Land Office. A post office named Binger opened in November, 1901.

Binger's early economy was based on agriculture in the surrounding area, and whose principal crops were peanuts and cotton. The Enid and Anadarko Railway constructed a line from Bridgeport to Anadarko via Binger in 1901-2. This railway was purchased by the Chicago, Rock Island and Pacific Railway in 1903, and was abandoned in 1939.

The Binger Journal, a weekly newspaper, began publication in 1902. Other early businesses included:the Newell Department Store, the First State Bank of Binger, the Binger Hotel, the L. A. Cross Lumber Company and the Deer Head Saloon. The population was 257 at the time of statehood in 1907, and increased to 280 in 1910.

According to the U.S. Census, the peak population was 849 in 1930, then dropped to 840 in 1940, and continuing to decline to 603 in 1960.

The Caddo Nation headquarters complex is located in Binger. It includes the Caddo Nation Heritage Museum, which opened in 2001.

Geography
Binger is located in northeast Caddo County at  (35.309023, -98.341243). It is in the valley of Sugar Creek, a tributary of the Washita River, part of the Red River watershed.

Oklahoma State Highway 152 also passes through the town, leading west  to New Cordell and east  to the center of Oklahoma City.

Demographics

As of the census of 2000, there were 712 people, 281 households, and 202 families residing in the town. The racial makeup of the town was 70.90% White, 4.80% African American, 13.70% Native American, 0.28% Asian, 3.81% from other races, and 6.50% from two or more races. Hispanic or Latino of any race were 7.06% of the population.

There were 281 households, out of which 33.5% had children under the age of 18 living with them, 54.8% were married couples living together, 12.1% had a female householder with no husband present, and 28.1% were non-families. 27.0% of all households were made up of individuals, and 16.4% had someone living alone who was 65 years of age or older. The average household size was 2.52 and the average family size was 3.05.

In the town, the population was spread out, with 27.5% under the age of 18, 5.4% from 18 to 24, 28.4% from 25 to 44, 22.6% from 45 to 64, and 16.1% who were 65 years of age or older. The median age was 38 years. For every 100 females, there were 92.9 males. For every 100 females age 18 and over, there were 92.9 males.

The median income for a household in the town was $24,333, and the median income for a family was $31,406. Males had a median income of $31,625 versus $19,844 for females. The per capita income for the town was $11,862. About 15.5% of families and 22.3% of the population were below the poverty line, including 28.6% of those under age 18 and 15.5% of those age 65 or over.

"The Mound"
"The Mound", a horror novella ghostwritten by H. P. Lovecraft for Zealia Bishop, takes place in Binger. Openings into the black abyss of N'Kai can be found near this town.

Notable people 
 Johnny Bench, Hall of Fame catcher for the Cincinnati Reds during the Big Red Machine era, spent much of his boyhood here
 Verlon Thompson, award-winning singer-songwriter, performer, partnered for many years with Guy Clark, Darrell Scott.

Notes

References

External links
 Binger-Oney Public Schools
 Encyclopedia of Oklahoma History and Culture - Binger

Towns in Oklahoma
Towns in Caddo County, Oklahoma
Caddo
Populated places established in 1901